Mucakuthi is a settlement in Kenya's Central Province with a population of around 150 tribesman and women.

References 

Populated places in Central Province (Kenya)